Novoselani (Cyrillic: Новоселани) may refer to:
 Novoselani, Dolneni a village in Municipality of Dolneni
 Novoselani, Mogila a village in Municipality of Mogila
 Novoselani, Češinovo-Obleševo a village in Municipality of Češinovo-Obleševo